Yhoan Andzouana (born 13 December 1996) is a Congolese professional footballer who plays as a midfielder for DAC Dunajská Streda in the Fortuna Liga.

Club career

Monaco
Andzouana made his professional debut on 26 April 2017 in the Coupe de France semi-final against Paris Saint-Germain. He started the game and played the whole match in a 5–0 away loss.

DAC Dunajská Streda
On 29 July 2020, Andzouana's transfer to Dunajská Streda was announced, as he signed a three-year deal with the Slovak club.

International career
He made his debut for Congo national football team on 13 November 2019 in a 2021 Africa Cup of Nations qualification game against Senegal.

Career statistics

Club 
(Correct as of 26 April 2017)

References

External links
 CAF profile
 
 

1996 births
Living people
Sportspeople from Brazzaville
Republic of the Congo footballers
Republic of the Congo expatriate footballers
Republic of the Congo international footballers
Association football defenders
AS Monaco FC players
CF Peralada players
Girona FC players
K.S.V. Roeselare players
FC DAC 1904 Dunajská Streda players
Ligue 1 players
Segunda División B players
Slovak Super Liga players
Expatriate footballers in Monaco
Republic of the Congo expatriate sportspeople in Monaco
Expatriate footballers in Belgium
Republic of the Congo expatriate sportspeople in Belgium
Expatriate footballers in Slovakia
Republic of the Congo expatriate sportspeople in Slovakia